Craig Wilson may refer to:

Craig Wilson (water polo) (born 1957), water polo player
Craig Wilson (third baseman, born 1964), Major League Baseball (MLB) third baseman
Craig Wilson (third baseman, born 1970), MLB third baseman
Craig Wilson (first baseman) (born 1976), MLB outfielder/first baseman
Craig Wilson (cricketer) (born 1974), South African cricketer
Craig Wilson (curler) (born 1973), Scottish curler
Craig Wilson (footballer) (born 1986), Scottish footballer
Craig Wilson (columnist), writer of USA Today column The Final Word
Craig Wilson (rugby league) (born 1969), Australian rugby league player